Darwin S. Karr (1875-1945)  was an American stage and silent film actor. He appeared in over 140 films up to 1922. He began appearing in films by the Vitagraph company. He was married to Florence Bindley.

Personal Life and death 
Karr was married to Florence Bindley.
In December 31, 1945, Karr died of complications cardiovascular disease (CVD) follow heart attack. His body was cremated at Forest Lawn Memorial Park, Glendale, California, U.S (Los Angeles Country)

Selected filmography
That Winsome Winnie Smile (1911)*short
Eugene Wrayburn (1911)*short
The Girl and the Motor Boat (1911)*short
A Modern Cinderella (1911)*short
Willie Wise and His Motor Boat (1911)*short
The Ghosts Warning (1911)*short
The Story of the Indian Ledge (1911)*short
Hands Across the Sea in '76 (1911)*short
A Solax Celebration (1912)*short
Mignon (1912)*short
Mrs. Cranston's Jewels (1912)*short
Lend Me Your Wife (1912)*short
A Terrible Lesson (1912)*short
Hearts and the Highway (1915)
West Wind (1915)*short
The Call of the Sea (1915)*short
The Village Homestead (1915)
The Lighthouse by the Sea (1915)*short
A Bit of Lace (1915)*short
The Losing Game (1915)*short
The Prisoner at the Bar (1916)*short
Britton of the Seventh (1916)
Folly (1916)*short
The Despoiler (1916)*short
Joyce's Strategy (1916)*short
Milestones (1916)*short
Her Naked Soul (1916)*short
The Condemnation (1916)*short
The Little Girl Next Door (1916)
Fool's Gold (1916)*short
The Way of Patience (1916)*short
The Unbeliever (1918)
Suds (1920)
The Sin Flood (1922)

References

External links
 
allmovie listing
Darwin Karr portraits(NY Public Library, Billy Rose collection)

1875 births
1945 deaths
American male silent film actors
20th-century American male actors
American male stage actors
People from New York (state)